Vamp Creek is a river in the Hudson Bay drainage basin in the Northern Region of Manitoba, Canada, approximately  north-east of Bakers Narrows.

Description
The remote creek flows through Churchill River Upland portion of the Midwestern Canadian Shield forests and is surrounded by mixed forest with stands of black spruce, white spruce, jack pine, and trembling aspen. The shoreline is characterized by steeply sloping irregular rock ridges and poorly drained areas of muskeg.

Vamp Creek area is difficult to access and largely pristine. It is home to moose, black bear, lynx, wolf, and beaver. It is part of the range of the Naosap woodland caribou herd. Bird species include raven, common loon, spruce grouse, bald eagle and hawk-owl. The creek is only accessible by canoe or snowmobile, but there is some trapping, and hunting activity.

Etymology

Vamp Creek was named during a 1920 expedition of the Dominion Land Survey. The surveyors lost a gramophone record of the Byron Gay song "The Vamp", published in 1919.

See also
List of rivers of Manitoba

References

Rivers of Northern Manitoba
Tributaries of Hudson Bay